The Travelers' Century Club, or TCC, is a club for people who have visited 100 or more of the world's countries and territories.

The organization was founded in California in 1954 and now has more than 1,400 members throughout the world. The club has twenty-one regional chapters in the United States, and one each in Australia, Canada, China, France, Germany, Korea, Spain, and the United Kingdom. It holds regular meetings and provides other tools for social networking.

Membership eligibility and the list
The TCC maintains a list of countries and territories by which initial membership and milestone recognition is determined. The list includes not only sovereign states but also certain territories, exclaves and island groups. As of January 2022, the list contains 330 such countries and territories. The club literature notes that "although some are not actually countries in their own right, they have been included because they are removed from the parent country", based on rules established in 1970. The designation of what qualifies to be on the list is very roughly based on the amateur radio DXCC award criteria for working 100 "entities."

The club has no requirements as to how long the traveler must have stayed in a country to qualify. Anyone who has visited 100 or more of the places on the list is eligible to join.

Records 
By 2018, twenty-four members had visited every place on the list. John Clouse, from Evansville, Indiana, was the first to travel to all of the organization's listed countries and was recognized by the 1995 Guinness World Records as "the world's most traveled man" taking the title from another TCC Club member Parke G. Thompson.
The youngest to join the club was Lani Shea, whose parents Jeff and Novita from Novato, California, reported that she reached her 100th country at an age of two years and eight months. She also set a new Guinness World Record under the category of "Youngest person to travel to all seven continents", accomplished in December 2003 when she was two years and 307 days. The record is currently held by Vaidehi Thirrupathy.
Indy Nelson from Hayward, California in 2017 became the youngest person, at 24, to visit all sovereign countries, having visited all 193 UN member states in 539 days.

Controversies 
In 2004, club member Charles Veley was featured in the UK's The Daily Telegraph as the new holder of the Guinness world record for World's Most Travelled Man, but this was never reflected in the Guinness Book of World Records. Instead Guinness retired the category citing lack of an objective standard for the title. Some world travelers dispute Veley's claim to be the new World's Most Traveled Man.

Notable members 
 Babis Bizas, Greek travel writer and tour operator
 David L. Cunningham, international filmmaker
 Richard Foltz, Canadian scholar
 Harry Mitsidis, Greek-British entrepreneur and founder of nomadmania.com
 Don Parrish, American adventurer
 Charles Veley, American entrepreneur and founder of mosttraveledpeople.com

References

Further reading

External links

Travelhotnews.com: Five minutes with the Travelers' Century Club - Canada – interview with the founder of the Canadian chapter of the club
The Vienna Review: Travel as a Way of Life – article about the club, its history, and some of its Austrian members

Travelers organizations
Non-profit organizations based in California
1954 establishments in California